The Merionethshire flag is the flag of the historic Welsh county of Merioneth. It was registered with the Flag Institute as the official flag of the county on 2 January 2015.



History
The design is adapted from the seal used by the former county council. This in turn derived from the anachronistic description of a banner borne by the men of Merioneth at the Battle of Agincourt, in the 17th-century poem of the same name by Michael Drayton. Here he wrote of “three goats dancing "gainst a rising sun"; the shield was blue, the sun golden and the goats white. Speculation regarding this unusual arrangement suggests a connection with Cader Idris, where goats browsed and behind which the sun rose. The flag therefore both maintains a theme associated with Merioneth for six centuries and is also a highly distinctive design – no other flag features a sun in this position and the arrangement is uniquely Merioneth.

See also

Notes

References

External links
[ Flag Institute – Merionethshire]

Merionethshire
Merionethshire
Merionethshire
Merionethshire